Prudencia María Victoria Grifell Masip (27 December 1879 – 7 June 1970) was a Spanish-Mexican actress and comedian.

Biography

Early life
Grifell was born to Spanish stage actors and started her acting career herself at the age of ten in theater in Venezuela and touring Spain and Latin America. By the 1900s she had become very popular and moved to Mexico to continue her career in stage, after the Spanish Civil War she decided not to go back to that country but instead to relocate in Mexico permanently after 1940.

Career
Three years later, already at the age of 61, she appeared in her first film Internado para señoritas ("Girls Boarding School") with the stars Mapy Cortés, Emilio Tuero and Katy Jurado. Just as Sara García, her co-star as the Vivanco sisters in two films, she mostly played feisty but lovable granny roles.

In 1961 she made a jump to the television industry starring in her first of many telenovela roles in Niebla with Amparo Rivelles and Ernesto Alonso.

Personal life
She was married to actor Paco Martínez until his death, and with whom she had five children, all of whom became actors: Maruja Grifell, Amparo Grifell, Enrique, Dolores, and Pepe Martínez.

She is considered one of the most notable people from Lugo, Spain and many have honored her life. A book in the Galician language was written about her life Prudencia Grifell, unha lucense no cine de ouro mexicano in 2005.

Telenovelas

 Plegaria en el camino (1969)
 Estafa de amor (1967)
 El despertar (1966) as Doña Remedios
 Sonata de otoño (1966)
 Las abuelas (1965)
 Corona de lágrimas (1964)
 Tres caras de mujer (1963)
 Borrasca (1962)
 La cobarde (1962)
 La madrastra (1962)
 Estafa de amor (1961)
 La leona (1961)
 Niebla (1961)
 Pensión de mujeres (1960)

Films

See also
 Foreign-born artists in Mexico

External links
 
 Corona de lágrimas at the telenovela database
  Biography
  Presentation of a book of her life

1879 births
1970 deaths
Ariel Award winners
Golden Age of Mexican cinema
Mexican film actresses
Mexican stage actresses
Mexican telenovela actresses
Mexican people of Galician descent
Mexican vedettes
Exiles of the Spanish Civil War in Mexico
People from Lugo